The Three Wishes or  De Drie Wensen  is a 1937 Dutch film directed by Kurt Gerron. Simultaneously, an Italian language version, I tre desideri, was filmed with Italian actors at Cinecitta' studios in Rome. Both movies were shot during the summer of 1937. The Dutch version was badly received and attendance was poor. The production suffered from delays and setbacks, forcing Dutch star Lien Deyers to resign. Her part was given to Annie van Duyn.

Cast
Annie Van Duyn	... 	Maria Scudo, kinderjuffrouw (as Annie van Duyn)
Jules Verstraete	... 	Oude miljonair
Jan Teulings... 	Tino Murante, Maria's vriend
Mimi Boesnach	... 	Cora Corelli, operaster
Piet Bron	... 	Fortini
Guus Oster	... 	Marco, Fortini's secretaris
Aaf Bouber	... 	Juffrouw Talloni (as Aaf Bouber-ten Hoope)
A.M. De Jong	... 	Rossi, impresario
Herman Bouber	... 	Campagni, chef van de claque
Kurt Gerron		
G.J. Teunissen	... 	Goedmoedige Lobbes
Arie Croiset

External links 
 

1937 films
Dutch black-and-white films
Dutch multilingual films
Dutch comedy films
1937 comedy films
1937 multilingual films
1930s Dutch-language films